Idactus rusticus is a species of beetle in the family Cerambycidae. It was described by Per Olof Christopher Aurivillius in 1916.

References

Ancylonotini
Beetles described in 1916